Neoguraleus protensus is an extinct species of sea snail, a marine gastropod mollusk in the family Mangeliidae.

Description
Two specimens turned up, which differ from the type by the predominating spiral sculpture and very feeble axial plications. Typically there are delicate spiral threads, but in our specimens there are distinct chords present, which are crossed by flexuous longitudinal striæ. Only the upper whorls are distinctly decussate. The protoconch, consisting of two smooth whorls, is much larger than in fossil specimens from Petane, more bulbose, and with an oblique nucleus.

Distribution
This extinct marine species is endemic to New Zealand from Pliocene strata of Petane.

References

 Hutton, Frederick Wollaston.Hutton, Trans. N.Z. Inst., vol. xvii, p. 317, 1885
 Maxwell, P.A. (2009). Cenozoic Mollusca. pp 232–254 in Gordon, D.P. (ed.) New Zealand inventory of biodiversity. Volume one. Kingdom Animalia: Radiata, Lophotrochozoa, Deuterostomia. Canterbury University Press, Christchurch.

External links
 Auckland Museum: Neoguraleus protensus

protensus
Gastropods described in 1885
Gastropods of New Zealand